Tariq Shah Bahramee (born 1967) is a general in the Afghan National Army and current ambassador of the Islamic Republic of Afghanistan to the Hashemite Kingdom of Jordan.

Early life and education 
He was born in the Qargha-e- district of Laghman Province, Afghanistan. He entered and district’s Primary and Secondary schools, then graduated from Sayed Noor Mohmmad Shah High School, in Kabul. Bahramee graduated from Military University in 1987. In 2014, he attended the Defense Academy of Advanced Command Staff College in the United Kingdom.

Military activities 

Bahramee started his military service in 1987 and served as deputy to Company Commander, then he served as deputy Battalion Commander in 1988, then Battalion Commander in 1989, and Chief of Documents and Planning Department at the Ministry of National Defense in 1990.

Bahramee re-joined the Afghan Armed Forces in 2002 after the civil war, later became the Military Assistant to Central Corpse Commander (201 Corpse) 2003-2008. Bahramee also held a series of positions in the Afghan National Army Central Command. In 2009, he took command of 444 Commando Unit (Regiment) during efforts to secure the east part of the country from insurgents, later on, he became Chief of Planning and Operations at the General Directorate of Police Special Unite (GDPSU).

Bahramee oversaw all training and education for the army's infantry, armor, and cavalry force. He commanded soldiers and organizations in wartime including Commander, Combined, and Joint Inter-Agency Task Force in Kabul, Afghanistan. He served as the Director of Office of the Commander–in–Chief and of the National Security Office of Afghanistan until 2017, and then was appointed as Senior Deputy Minister of Interior. Bahramee then succeeded LT. General Abdullah Habibi as the National Defense Minister, position that he would hold until December 2018. He remained on active duty as a lieutenant general while serving as National Defense Minister. In 2018, he was assigned as an Ambassador Plenipotentiary of the Islamic Republic of Afghanistan to the Hashemite Kingdom of Jordan.

References 

1967 births
Living people
Afghan military officers
People from Laghman Province
Defence ministers of Afghanistan